Bonderup, also known as Bonderupgård, is a manor house located  south of Holbæk, Denmark. It was purchased by the merchant Johannes Theodorus Suhr in 1852 and is now owned by the Suhr Family Trust (Den Suhrske Stiftelse).

History
The first known reference to Bonderup is from 1421, but it was then probably a village. A manor house was later created at the site through the merger of several farms. The first known owner of the estate was Claus Basse, who ceded it to his daughter Ellen Basse in 1566. She married Otte Norby. After his death in 1592, it was acquired by Christoffer Pax, a member of the noble family Packisch von Festenberg, which had been established in Denmark earlier in the century. The ownership during the next decades is unclear but Else Thott was its owner in 1625. She was first married to Hans Lindenov but later married Corfitz Ulfeldt. Christen Friis purchased Bonderup in 1631 but sold it again to Anne Brahe in 1632. Bonderup was a relatively small estate whose owners usually also owned other manor houses and usually resided elsewhere. It changed hands many times during the 17th and 18th centuries.

Bonderup was purchased by count Frederik Knuth in 1808. His son, count Frederik Christian Julius von Knuth took over the estate in 1816. His heirs sold Bonderup to the wealthy merchant Johannes Theodorus Suhr in 1852. He renovated the buildings with the assistance of the prominent architect Ferdinand Meldahl and also charged him with the design of a new dairy. Mixing with the political and cultural elite of the time, Suhr invited Johan Ludvig Heiberg to use Bonderup as a summer residence. Having no children, Suhr created a family trust, Den Suhrske Stiftelse, which owned the estate after his death in 1858, but the Heibergs continued to spend their summers there. Johan Ludvig Heiberg died at Bonderup in 1860. His widow remained at Bonderup for another couple of months before returning to Copenhagen.

Today
Bonderup and Merløsegaard are still owned by Den Suhrske Stiftelse and have a combined area of 1310 hectares. A total of 25 houses and commercial properties on the estate are rented out by the trust.

List of owners
 (1727–1730) Hans Hartmann
 (1730–1737) P. Fr. Kling
 (1744–      ) Johannes Mørch
 (      –1747) Jens Bremer
 (1747–1749) Søren Hansen Seidelin
 (1749–1752) Knud Gregorius de Klumann
 (1752–1754) Holger Skeel
 (1754–1766) Christian Frederik Holstein-Ledreborg
 (1766–1796) P. Larsen Wiihm
 (1796–1803) Thomas Christian Bruun de Neergaard
 (1803–1808) Søren Henrik Lund
 (1808–1816) Frederik Knuth
 (1816–1852) Frederik Christian Julius Knuth
 (1852–1858) Johannes Theodorus Suhr
 (1858–present) Den Suhrske Stiftelse

References

External links
 Suhr Foundation

Manor houses in Holbæk Municipality
Buildings and structures associated with the Knuth family
Buildings and structures associated with the Suhr family